Coterie is a four-member Australian-New Zealand band. Formed from four brothers who were born in New Zealand and grew up in Perth, Western Australia, the band received recognition for the 2021 single "Cool It Down", which was a hit in New Zealand.

Biography

The fisher brothers' parents are musicians from New Zealand. While on tour, they decided to relocate the family from Papakura in Auckland to Perth, Western Australia. The family's roots are in Tauranga and Northland, and are of Te Aupōuri, Ngāpuhi and Ngāi Te Rangi descent.

The brothers formed as a musical act in 2016, and prior to this had worked on a number of different music projects, including Tastemakers, an online series where the brothers collaborated with Western Australian artists. The band released their first single "Where We Began" in 2019, and focused their early career on the local Perth music scene. The group released their first single under major label Island Records Australia in 2020, parting with the label in 2021 and releasing the single "Good Morning" independently. In late 2021 and 2022, Coterie toured Australia with New Zealand band Six60.

In 2022 the band had their first hit single in New Zealand with the song "Cool It Down", which was certified platinum in New Zealand. The band released a Māori language version of the song, a week prior to Te Wiki o te Reo Māori.

Discography

Studio albums

Singles

Promotional singles

Other charted songs

Notes

References

2016 establishments in Australia
Māori-language singers
Musical groups established in 2016
New Zealand musical groups
Musical groups from Perth, Western Australia
New Zealand Māori musical groups
New Zealand reggae musical groups
Ngāi Te Rangi
Ngāpuhi
Pacific reggae
Sibling quartets
Te Aupōuri